"Miracle Goodnight" is a song by English singer-songwriter David Bowie, released as the third single from his 1993 album, Black Tie White Noise. While the previous two singles from the album, "Jump They Say" and "Black Tie White Noise", covered issues such as mental illness and legal injustice, "Miracle Goodnight" features a more unabashed recurring theme of the album – Bowie's love for his new bride, Iman Abdulmajid. He declared the whole album "a wedding present" for Iman.

Released as a single, the song also had a music video directed by Matthew Rolston, featuring Bowie unmoved by a harem of beautiful women while singing the song to camera, as well as scenes of him in a jester's outfit, playing with mirrors, dressed as a mime, and even returning briefly to his fashion style as the Thin White Duke from 1976. "Miracle Goodnight" had the usual plethora of remixes his recent multi-format singles had featured and reached No. 40 in the UK Singles Chart.

Critical reception
Alan Jones from Music Week wrote, "This is one of Black Tie White Noises more attractive tracks, an offbeat and intimate affair with flashes of the old Bowie in the counter harmonies." A reviewer from Philadelphia Inquirer said, "'Miracle Goodnight' may boast one of the clumsiest lyrics D. B. has ever penned (I wished I was a sailor a thousand miles from here / I wished I had a future / Anywhere). But with a house-quaking foundation, Rodgers' sparkling, Caribbean-flavored guitar solo, and a Philip Glass-like coda, "Miracle" adds up to one of Bowie's most endearing numbers."

Track listings
All tracks were by written by David Bowie.

 7-inch: Arista-BMG / 74321 16226 7 (Netherlands)
 "Miracle Goodnight" – 4:14
 "Looking for Lester" – 5:36

 12-inch: Arista-BMG / 74321 16226 1 (Netherlands)
 "Miracle Goodnight" (Blunted 2) – 8:12
 "Miracle Goodnight" (Make Believe Mix) – 4:14
 "Miracle Goodnight" (2 Chord Philly Mix) – 6:22
 "Miracle Goodnight" (Dance Dub) – 7:50

 CD: Arista-BMG / 74321 16226 2 (Netherlands)
 "Miracle Goodnight" – 4:14
 "Miracle Goodnight" (2 Chord Philly Mix) – 6:22
 "Miracle Goodnight" (Masereti Blunted Dub) – 7:40
 "Looking for Lester" – 5:36

 Digital download
 "Miracle Goodnight" – 4:15
 "Miracle Goodnight" (2 Chord Philly Mix) – 6:25
 "Miracle Goodnight" (Masereti Blunted Dub) – 7:43
 "Miracle Goodnight" (Make Believe Mix) – 4:30

Personnel
Production
 Nile Rodgers

Remix production
 Tony Maserati and Robert Holms for Two Chord Music

Musicians
 David Bowie – vocals, saxophone on "Looking for Lester"
 Nile Rodgers – guitar
 Barry Campbell – bass
 Sterling Campbell – drums
 Richard Hilton – keyboards
 Lester Bowie – trumpet
 Mike Garson – piano on "Looking for Lester"

Other releases
 The "Make Believe Mix" of the song was included on the bonus disc for the 10th anniversary edition of Black Tie White Noise. It was the first time the mix was available on CD.

References

 Black Tie White Noise Limited Edition DVD, 2004
 Pegg, Nicholas, The Complete David Bowie, Reynolds & Hearn Ltd, 2000, 

1993 singles
1993 songs
Arista Records singles
David Bowie songs
Song recordings produced by Nile Rodgers
Songs written by David Bowie